Peaches: The Very Best of The Stranglers is a compilation album by The Stranglers, released in 2002 by EMI. It reached No. 21 in the UK Albums Chart in June 2002.

The album cover was designed by design4music who would design a similar cover for the compilation The Best Bands...Ever! several months later.

On 27 November 2020, the compilation was released on vinyl for the first time as a double-LP set through Parlophone.

Critical reception

AllMusic called it "one of the better introductions to the band available," and Classic Rock a "consistently accomplished collection." Classic Rock, however, felt that "the randomised track-listing doesn't help tell the story, presenting instead post-punk's very own Jekyll and Hyde. The bloodthirsty likes of "Something Better Change" and "5 Minutes" land jarringly between sophisticated 80s pop moments such as "Strange Little Girl", "Skin Deep" and "Always the Sun", momentum superseding plot."

Track listing

Personnel
See original albums for full credits.

The Stranglers
 Hugh Cornwell – guitar, vocals
 Dave Greenfield – keyboards
 Jean-Jacques Burnel – bass, vocals
 Jet Black – drums 

Additional musicians

 Eric Clarke – tenor saxophone (15)
 John Ellis – additional guitar (13)

Technical

 Martin Rushent – production (1, 3, 4, 6, 8, 9, 12, 15, 17)
 The Stranglers – production (2, 5, 7, 10, 11, 13, 14, 16, 18, 19)
 Alan Winstanley – production (11, 16, 18)
 Steve Churchyard – production (2, 10, 14)
 Laurie Latham – production (5)
 Mike Kemp – production (13)
 Ted Hayton – production (7)
 Roy Thomas Baker – production (20)
 Michael Brauer – remixing (13)
 Barry Cooder – remixing (15)
 Taff B. Dylan – remixing (15)
 design4music.com – design

References

2002 compilation albums
The Stranglers compilation albums
EMI Records compilation albums